Frans Joseph Frits Maria "Frans-Jozef" van Thiel (19 December 1906 – 2 June 1993) was a Dutch politician of the defunct Catholic People's Party (KVP) now merged into the Christian Democratic Appeal (CDA) and lawyer.

He was a member of the House of Representatives from 1948 until 1972, with exception of the fours years from 1952–1956 in which he served as minister of Social Work. He was Speaker of the House of Representatives in the period 29 January 1963 – 7 December 1972.

Decorations

References

External links

Official
  Mr. F.J.F.M. (Frans-Jozef) van Thiel Parlement & Politiek

1906 births
1993 deaths
Catholic People's Party politicians
Commanders of the Order of the Netherlands Lion
Chairmen of Trade associations of the Netherlands
Dutch corporate directors
Dutch nonprofit directors
Dutch jurists
Dutch people of World War II
Dutch prosecutors
Dutch prisoners of war in World War II
Dutch Roman Catholics
Grand Officers of the Order of Orange-Nassau
Ministers of Social Work of the Netherlands
Ministers of Sport of the Netherlands
Members of the House of Representatives (Netherlands)
Municipal councillors in North Holland
Speakers of the House of Representatives (Netherlands)
People from Helmond
Radboud University Nijmegen alumni
Recipients of the Order of the House of Orange
Roman Catholic State Party politicians
World War II prisoners of war held by Germany
World War II civilian prisoners
20th-century Dutch lawyers
20th-century Dutch politicians